This list of tallest buildings in Qingdao ranks skyscrapers in Qingdao,  in Shandong, China by height. The tallest building in Qingdao is currently the Qingdao International Finance Centre  which rises 249 m (816 feet).

Qingdao is the second and a sub-provincial city in Shandong Province, with total of 7.5 million in population and nearly three million in the urban area, it is the richest city in Shandong Province.

With four buildings taller than 200 meters, Qingdao is ranked 12th best skyline in China and 45th in the World.

Tallest buildings
This lists ranks Qingdao skyscrapers that stand at least 120 m (394 feet) tall, based on standard height measurement. This includes spires and architectural details but does not include antenna masts. Existing structures are included for ranking purposes based on present height. All the structures in this list has been topped, but some may not be ready to use.

Tallest under construction, approved, and proposed

Under construction
This list buildings that are under construction in Qingdao and that are planned to rise at least 100 m (328 feet). Buildings that have already been topped out are not included.

References

External links
 Qingdao Skycraper on Skycraperpage.com 
 The World's best Skyline
 Qingdao Skycrapers in Emporis.com
 Skyscrapers of Qingdao on Gaoloumi (in Chinese)

Qingdao
Buildings and structures in Qingdao